Kate Adams is a Scottish international indoor and lawn bowler.

Adams won the Women's singles at the 1993 World Indoor Bowls Championship defeating Jayne Roylance in the final.

References

Living people
Scottish female bowls players
Year of birth missing (living people)
Place of birth missing (living people)
Indoor Bowls World Champions